Ctenophorus slateri, commonly known as Slater's dragon, is a species of agamid lizard occurring in ranges of the Northern Territory in Australia.

It was formerly considered to be a subspecies of Ctenophorus caudicinctus.

References

Agamid lizards of Australia
slateri
Endemic fauna of Australia
Reptiles described in 1967
Taxa named by Glen Milton Storr